Conus carnalis is a species of sea snail, a marine gastropod mollusk in the family Conidae, the cone snails and their allies.

Like all species within the genus Conus, these snails are predatory and venomous. They are capable of "stinging" humans, therefore live ones should be handled carefully or not at all.

Description
The size of the shell varies between 34 mm and 63 mm.

Distribution
This species occurs in the Atlantic Ocean off Angola.

References

 Sowerby, G. B., III. 1879. Descriptions of ten new species of shells. Proceedings of the Zoological Society of London 1878:795–798, pl. 48
 Puillandre N., Duda T.F., Meyer C., Olivera B.M. & Bouchet P. (2015). One, four or 100 genera? A new classification of the cone snails. Journal of Molluscan Studies. 81: 1–23

External links

 The Conus Biodiversity website
 Cone Shells – Knights of the Sea
 
 Specimen at MNHN, Paris

Endemic fauna of Angola
carnalis
Gastropods described in 1879